Burton Lynn Pascoe (born July 7, 1943) served as Under-Secretary-General of the United Nations at the UN Department of Political Affairs from 2007 to June 2012, where he oversaw the UN's diplomatic efforts to prevent and mitigate conflict around the globe.

Career
Pascoe was previously United States Ambassador to Indonesia after being nominated by President George W. Bush from 2004 to 2007, and to Malaysia from 1999 to 2001.

On 4 September 2001, he took up duties as Deputy Assistant Secretary for European and Eurasian Affairs at the U.S. State Department. Earlier, he served as U.S. Special Negotiator for Nagorno-Karabakh and Regional Conflicts and the U.S. co-chair of the OSCE Minsk Group of the Organization for Security and Cooperation in Europe.

From 1993 to 1996, he was the director of the American Institute in Taiwan (AIT). He also served as the Principal Deputy Assistant Secretary in the East Asian and Pacific Bureau of the State Department, Deputy Chief of Mission (DCM) at the United States Embassy in Beijing (from 1989 to 1992), Deputy Executive Secretary of the Department of States and Special Assistant to the Deputy Secretary of State.

In his diplomatic career, he has been posted to Moscow, Hong Kong, Beijing, Taipei, and Kuala Lumpur. He speaks Mandarin Chinese.

On February 21, 2010, three days after North Korea declared it would not abandon its nuclear weapons program, Pascoe, who had just visited Pyongyang, strongly defended international food aid to the country.
"These are human beings that need the food. It's not the political system. This shouldn't be argued in a political way," he told CNN's Christiane Amanpour.

Personal life
Born in 1943, he obtained his Bachelor of Arts from the University of Kansas with three bachelor's degrees in East Asian languages and cultures, international relations, and mathematics and his Master of Arts from Columbia University, focusing on Chinese government affairs and international relations.

He is married with two daughters.

Notes and references

Notes

References

External links

United Nations Department of Political Affairs

Ambassadors of the United States to Indonesia
Ambassadors of the United States to Malaysia
Under-Secretaries-General of the United Nations
Directors of the American Institute in Taiwan
University of Kansas alumni
Columbia University alumni
1943 births
Living people
American officials of the United Nations
United States Foreign Service personnel